Alsophylax pipiens, also known as the even-fingered gecko, is a species of gecko found in 
Mongolia (Gobi Desert),
former USSR between Wolga and Ural; Kazakhstan (Caspian Sea to Lake Zaysan) south to Uzbekistan, N Turkmenistan, Kyrgyzstan, NW China and S Russia (Astrakhan Oblast).

References

Alsophylax
Reptiles described in 1827